1208 (generally pronounced "twelve-o-eight" or "twelve-zero-eight") was an American punk rock band from Hermosa Beach, California that formed in 1994.

The name "1208" came from the apartment number they first shared. They released two full-length studio albums on Epitaph Records: Feedback Is Payback (2002) and Turn of the Screw (2004). Their song "Fall Apart" from Turn of The Screw was featured on the popular PlayStation 2 and Xbox game Burnout 3.

In November 2006, the band was reported to be working on a third album, however the album never materialized.

1208 reunited in 2009 for a one-off show with T.S.O.L. All original members performed, with the exception of drummer Manny McNamara. Deviates drummer Donald Conrad filled in on drums. Singer Alex Flynn is the nephew of Black Flag founder Greg Ginn and artist Raymond Pettibon.

Members
 Alex Flynn - vocals
 Neshawn Hubbard - guitar
 Bryan Parks - bass
 Manny McNamara - drums

Discography
Feedback Is Payback (2002)
Turn of the Screw (2004)

Singles
"Scared Away" from Feedback Is Payback
"Jimmy" from Feedback Is Payback
"Next Big Thing" from Turn of the Screw

Music videos
 "Jimmy" (2002)
 "Next Big Thing" (2004)

References

External links
[ 1208] at Allmusic

Punk rock groups from California
Epitaph Records artists
Musical groups established in 1994
1994 establishments in California